The 2024 South Asian Games, officially the XIV South Asian Games, will be a major multi-sport event which will be held in Pakistan,and will have Lahore, the capital of Punjab province as main host city. The cities of Faisalabad, Gujranwala, Islamabad and Sialkot will give support to Lahore hosting some sports. The Games were scheduled to be held in March 2023. but later postponed to March 2024 by SAOC members, at the Olympic Council of Asia (OCA) conference in Phnom Penh, Cambodia. This will mark the first time that Pakistan has hosted the South Asian Games since 2004, and the first time that Pakistan has hosted the event outside of Islamabad.

Host selection 
In 2019, the Sri Lankan Ministry of Sports announced that Sri Lanka had bid in a partnership with the Maldives. However, Pakistan was announced as host by the South Asian Olympic Council in December 2019. On 10 December, POA President Arif Hassan received the games flag.

Development and preparation

Venues and infrastructure 
It was reported that the Government of Pakistan designated around Rs 2 billion for infrastructure. In July 2020, it was announced that the federal government had set forth more than Rs3.5 billion for the South Asian Games.

The Pakistan Olympic Association (POA) wants to base these Games in Lahore while holding selected sports in other cities which are hubs within the country for each one. Gujranwala is being considered for weightlifting and wrestling competitions while Sialkot and Narowal for volleyball. Faisalabad is under consideration for handball while along with it, Gojra is under consideration for field hockey. Kasur may also be one of the venues. It was also reported that the POA intends to organise the football competition in Karachi, Sindh. In May 2020, Mardan, Khyber Pakhtunkhwa, expressed hosting events at a gymnasium, despite not being a host city. Syed Aqil Shah, President of the Khyber Pakhtunkhwa Olympic Association requested that the POA should include Peshawar as one of the host cities for the Games.

“We will place athletes in these sports in these cities which are about two hours away by road from Lahore,” Hasan, Vice President of Olympic Council of Asia added. Pakistan has hosted the South Asian Games twice before – in 2004 and 1989, both times in Islamabad. “We are looking forward to hosting the South Asian Games again. It is our turn and we hope that all countries including India will turn up. We will ensure that security is high and we will be inviting India. I’m very confident that India will accept our invitation".

On 11 January 2021, Prime Minister Imran Khan gave a go-ahead signal to the Pakistan Olympic Association (POA) and the Federal Sports Ministry to host the Games. On 15 January 2021, POA President Syed Arif Hasan further said that the venues have almost been finalised and in the next meeting with the federal sports minister on 18 January in Islamabad, several other key decisions would be taken with respect to holding the Games.

On 12 July 2021, it was confirmed that certain sports will be held in other cities including Faisalabad, Gujranwala, Islamabad and Sialkot. On 11 February 2022, it was announced that the government wanted the opening ceremony and closing ceremonies in Islamabad and Lahore, respectively, and for football competitions to be held in Lahore. On 13 February 2022, the government announced plans to hold the event by March 2023 in Lahore, Faisalabad and Islamabad.

The Games

Participating nations 
Seven countries are expected to compete.

Sports 
 
 
 
 
 
 
 
 
 
 Mountain biking (4)
 Road (4)
 
 
 
 
 
 
 
 
 
 
 
 
 
 
 Duathlon (2)
 Triathlon (3)
 Volleyball

See also 

 South Asian Games celebrated in Pakistan
 1989 South Asian Games – Islamabad
 2004 South Asian Games – Islamabad
 2024 South Asian Games – Lahore
 South Asian Games

References 

South Asian Games
International sports competitions hosted by Pakistan
Multi-sport events in Pakistan
2024 in Asian sport
Sport in Punjab, Pakistan
Sport in Lahore
South Asian Games
South Asian Games
South Asian Games